The 2011 Census of India lists two villages called Brahmanwadi in Mawal taluka, Pune district, in the state of Maharashtra. Both form a part of the Karanjgaon gram panchayat and are listed separately from the village of Brahman Wadi in the same taluka.

It comprised 145 households. The population of 834 was split between 410 males and 424 females. It comprised 150 households. The population of 973 was split between 506 males and 467 females.

See also
List of villages in Mawal taluka

References

Villages in Mawal taluka